Larry Semillano (born 7 March 1976) is a Filipino boxer. He competed in the men's lightweight event at the 2000 Summer Olympics. Semillano also boxed for the Philippines at the Southeast Asian Games. He later worked as a boxing coach mentoring amateur boxing team of Bago.

References

External links
 

1976 births
Living people
Filipino male boxers
Olympic boxers of the Philippines
Boxers at the 2000 Summer Olympics
People from Negros Occidental
Southeast Asian Games medalists in boxing
Southeast Asian Games silver medalists for the Philippines
Southeast Asian Games bronze medalists for the Philippines
Competitors at the 2001 Southeast Asian Games
Competitors at the 2007 Southeast Asian Games
Lightweight boxers